Earl Edward Williams, Jr. (July 14, 1948 – January 28, 2013) was an American Major League Baseball player. Though he never played catcher in the minor leagues, he earned the National League's Rookie of the Year award at that position in 1971.

Early years
Williams was born in Newark, New Jersey, and raised in East Orange, and then Montclair, where he was an exceptional athlete at Montclair High School. He earned a scholarship to Ithaca College in upstate New York for basketball. He chose baseball instead when he was drafted by the Milwaukee Braves in the first round of the 1965 Major League Baseball August Legion Draft.

As Williams was a pitcher in high school, he made eight starts in his first professional season with the Gulf Coast League Braves, compiling a 1–0 record and 3.10 earned run average. When not pitching, Williams played first base. The idea of Williams as a pitcher was abandoned after the 1966 season, and Williams spent most of his time in the Braves' farm system either at first or in the outfield. In 1970, he also played some third base. He debuted with the Atlanta Braves that September, and batted .368 in ten games split pretty evenly between first and third base.

Rookie catcher
Williams began the 1971 season as the Braves' backup corner infielder, but on April 16 began playing third base regularly in place of a disgruntled, soon-to-be-released Clete Boyer. The following day Williams hit his first two major league home runs at Philadelphia's brand new Veterans Stadium, and on April 18 became the first player to hit a home run into the stadium's upper deck. By the end of May, Darrell Evans took over at third, and Williams began seeing more playing time at first base. On May 23, Williams entered a 4–0 loss to the New York Mets at Shea Stadium as a pinch hitter in the eighth inning, and remained in the game at catcher. It was his first professional experience behind the plate ever.

He made his first start behind the plate on June 20 against the Cincinnati Reds. George Foster led off the Reds' half of the second inning with a single, then proceeded to take full advantage of Williams' inexperience at his new position. Foster stole second, advanced to third on Williams' throwing error, then stole home to score the first run of the game.

The following day, Williams caught both games of a doubleheader against the Montreal Expos, and caught his first attempted base stealer, Rusty Staub. He ended up appearing in 72 games at catcher, committing eight errors and catching 28% of potential base stealers. On September 10, Williams became the only Braves player besides Hank Aaron to hit a home run into the upper deck at Fulton County Stadium. Aaron was also the first right-handed hitter to do it, and Williams was the second. The feat had been preceded by the left-handed hitters Willie Smith and Willie Stargell.

Although he never developed into more than a poor defensive catcher, his offensive numbersa .260 batting average, 33 home runs and 87 runs batted inwere enough to earn him 18 of 24 first place votes to become the first Brave to win the Rookie of the Year Award since Sam Jethroe in 1950 with what were then the Boston Braves. The other first place votes went to Philadelphia Phillies centerfielder Willie Montañez.

Though he played some first and third also, Williams spent most of the 1972 season catching. He had a whopping 28 passed balls that season, mostly due to his inability to catch Phil Niekro's knuckleball. However, he also had 28 home runs and 87 RBIs, drawing the attention of the Baltimore Orioles who acquired him along with Taylor Duncan from the Braves for Davey Johnson, Pat Dobson, Johnny Oates and Roric Harrison on the last day of the Winter Meetings on December 1, 1972.

Baltimore Orioles
Many Oriole players, most notably ace pitcher Jim Palmer, were critical of this trade. Ironically, Palmer was 13–5 in games in which he pitched to Williams, and went on to win his first Cy Young Award in 1973. Williams batted .237 with 22 home runs and 83 RBIs his first season in the American League. Williams reached the post season for the only time in his career with the Orioles in 1973 and 1974, losing to the Oakland Athletics in the American League Championship Series both years. His only post-season home run came off Ken Holtzman in the 1973 American League Championship Series.

Return to the National League
After the 1974 season, he was traded back to the Atlanta Braves for pitcher Jimmy Freeman. He appeared in just eleven games at catcher in 1975, receiving most of his playing time at first base. He batted .240 with a career low eleven home runs in his new role. He began seeing more time behind the plate again in 1976, however, in June his contract was sold to the Montreal Expos, with whom he played mostly first base. For the season, his numbers bounced back somewhat, as he hit seventeen home runs and drove in 55 runs.

Oakland A's
The Expos released Williams during Spring training 1977, and he signed with the Oakland A's a few days later. He split his time with the A's fairly evenly between catching, first base and designated hitter. He batted .241 with thirteen home runs and 38 RBIs his only season in Oakland. He was placed on waivers by the A's at the end of Spring training 1978. Failing to find a taker, he was released on May 17.

Career stats

Williams had a career .984 fielding percentage at catcher, and a .991 fielding percentage at first base. His worst position was third base, where he had a .892 fielding percentage.

Death
Williams died of acute myeloid leukemia at his home in the Somerset section of Franklin Township, Somerset County, New Jersey on January 28, 2013, at the age of 64. His wife Linda and her daughter Raquel were with him.

References

External links

1948 births
2013 deaths
African-American baseball players
Alacranes de Durango players
American expatriate baseball players in Canada
American expatriate baseball players in Mexico
Atlanta Braves players
Baltimore Orioles players
Baseball players from Newark, New Jersey
Deaths from cancer in New Jersey
Deaths from leukemia
Greenwood Braves players
Major League Baseball catchers
Major League Baseball first basemen
Major League Baseball Rookie of the Year Award winners
Montclair High School (New Jersey) alumni
Montreal Expos players
National League All-Stars
Oakland Athletics players
People from Montclair, New Jersey
Richmond Braves players
Shreveport Braves players
Sportspeople from East Orange, New Jersey
Sportspeople from Franklin Township, Somerset County, New Jersey
West Palm Beach Braves players
20th-century African-American sportspeople
21st-century African-American people